Immoidea is a superfamily of pantropical moths containing only the family Immidae comprising ten genera with around 250 species, over half of them in the genus Imma. Many are brightly coloured and diurnal. The position of this group is currently uncertain within the group Obtectomera . The larvae feed on the leaves of dicotyledons and conifers including Podocarpus (Dugdale et al. 1999).

References
Dugdale, J.S., Kristensen, N.P., Robinson, G.S. and Scoble, M.J. (1999). The smaller microlepidoptera grade superfamilies,  Ch.13., pp. 217–232 in Kristensen, N.P. (Ed.). Lepidoptera, Moths and Butterflies. Volume 1: Evolution, Systematics, and Biogeography. Handbuch der Zoologie. Eine Naturgeschichte der Stämme des Tierreiches / Handbook of Zoology. A Natural History of the phyla of the Animal Kingdom. Band / Volume IV Arthropoda: Insecta Teilband / Part 35: 491 pp. Walter de Gruyter, Berlin, New York.

Sources
Firefly Encyclopedia of Insects and Spiders, edited by Christopher O'Toole, 2002

External links
Tree of Life
Australian Moths Online

 
Moth families
Pantropical fauna